El crucifijo de piedra ("The Crucifix of Stone") is a 1956 Mexican film. It stars Sara García.

External links
 

1956 films
Mexican drama films
1950s Spanish-language films
1950s Mexican films
Mexican black-and-white films